Neoregelia bahiana is a species of flowering plant in the genus Neoregelia.

Cultivars
 Neoregelia 'Brazilian Pepper'
 Neoregelia 'Lovely K'
 Neoregelia 'Nutmeg'

References

BSI Cultivar Registry Retrieved 11 October 2009

bahiana